Sudar na paralelama is a Croatian drama film directed by Jože Babič. It was released in 1961, and later selected for preservation by the Croatian State Archives. The film was released in SFR Yugoslavia, Bulgaria, Venezuela, Cuba, East Germany and Egypt.

Plot summary 

A man (Mića Orlović) returns home from a business trip to learn that his wife (Jelena Jovanović-Žigon) is supposed to go on a business trip of her own with her boss (Boris Kralj). He is jealous and, their relationship soured by previous fights, takes a lot of convincing to let her take the trip. However, as she leaves, he changes her mind and surreptitiously boards her train.

Cast 
 Jelena Jovanović-Žigon as wife
 Mića Orlović as husband
 Boris Kralj as the boss
 Olga Palinkaš as the flight attendant
 Andrea Sarić as girl in a dress
 Ivona Petri as grandmother
 Zlatko Madunić as train conductor
 Rudolf Kukić as man in the store
 Ljubo Dijan as man with the foxes
 Zoran Vuk as boy

References

External links 
 

1961 films
1960s Croatian-language films
Jadran Film films
Croatian drama films
1961 drama films
Yugoslav drama films